Arman Karamyan (born 14 November 1979) is a retired Armenian footballer and former international for the Armenia national football team. Arman is the twin brother of fellow football player Artavazd Karamyan.

Club career

Arabkir
Arman Karamyan began playing football as a senior in 1996. That year, both he and his older brother Artavazd Karamyan joined Arabkir.

Pyunik Yerevan
In 1997, they both made their way to Pyunik Yerevan. Arman was a part of Pyunik when they won the Armenian Premier League in 2001 and 2002, the Armenian Cup in 2002 and Armenian Supercup in 1997 and 2002.

Kilikia Yerevan and return to Pyunik Yerevan
Both brothers moved to Kilikia Yerevan in 1999 and back to Pyunik in 2001.

Panachaiki Patras
They both joined the Football League (Greece) in 2003 when they both signed with Panachaiki Patras.

Arsenal Kyiv
From 2003 to 2004, they both played in Ukrainian Premier League club Arsenal Kyiv.

Rapid București
Arman and Artavazd both joined Liga I club Rapid București in 2004. While Arman left that season, Artavazd would remain in the club for a number of seasons.

Loans to Braşov and Gloria Bistriţa
Arman was loaned to other Liga I clubs Braşov and Gloria Bistriţa for the 2005 season.

Second loan to Braşov
He was loaned to Braşov again at the start of the 2006 season.

Ceahlăul Piatra Neamţ
Arman than officially signed with Ceahlăul Piatra Neamţ.

Politehnica Timişoara
Both Arman and Artavazd reunited in the club Politehnica Timişoara in 2007. The next season, the club was a finalist in the 2008–09 Liga I championship.

Steaua București
The Karamyan brothers moved to Steaua București in 2010. In the 2009–10 season, Arman was selected as the left winger of the year. After finishing Liga I for the 2009–10 season, the brothers ended their contracts with Steaua București. A search began to find the club they would both continue playing football in. But the process of finding a new club was delayed. Later, it was reported that the brothers were in talks with Braşov. However, the head coach of Braşov Daniel Isăilă later stated that the transition of the Karmanyans was unlikely to be completed because of the complexity of the negotiations, which reached a standstill. Talks were later made for the brothers to play for Astra Giurgiu, coached by Mihai Stoichiță. But after Stoichiță departed from the club, the talks ended. According to an edition of TotalFootball, because of the long search for a new team, the financial conditions for the Karamyan brothers increased to that of a required minimum of 10,000 euros per month. The option that both players finish their playing careers and enter into coaching activities was considered.

Unirea Urziceni
In mid-September 2010, the search was over for Karamyan brothers. The football players signed a contract with and officially moved into Unirea Urziceni. Near the end of a match, Arman made his debut for the club coming in as a substitute for 81tH minute of the game.

In late October 2011, Stoichiță, who knew firsthand the playing abilities of both brothers, invited them to his current team Mioveni. However, Artavazd decided to retire as a player and go into business.

Buftea
A year later, Artavazd resumed his career and he and Arman both joined the Liga II club Buftea. In their first meeting, Artavazd scored twice. Arman also scored a goal in their second match.

International career
Karamyan was a member of the Armenia national team and had participated in 49 international matches and scored 5 goals since his debut in an away friendly match against Guatemala on 9 January 2000 ending 1–1. In 2010, he left the national team.

Personal life
He and his brother Artavazd Karamyan were both football players and have spent nearly their entire careers playing for the same teams.

At the end 2014 he took the Romanian citizenship, together with his brother. They are living in Romania with their kids and wives.

National team statistics

International goals

Honours

Club
Kilikia Yerevan
Armenian Supercup (1): 1997

Pyunik Yerevan
Armenian Premier League (2): 2001, 2002
Armenian Cup (1): 2002
Armenian Supercup (2): 2002

Politehnica Timişoara
Liga I Runner-up (1): 2008–09
Cupa României Runner-up (1): 2008–09

Individual
Armenian Footballer of the Year: 2002
Armenian Premier League Top Goalscorer (2): 2001 (21 goals), 2002 (36 goals)

References

External links

Armfootball.tripod.com

1979 births
Armenian twins
Living people
Footballers from Yerevan
Association football forwards
Armenian footballers
Armenia international footballers
Armenian expatriate footballers
FC Pyunik players
Panachaiki F.C. players
FC Arsenal Kyiv players
FC Rapid București players
FC Brașov (1936) players
ACF Gloria Bistrița players
CSM Ceahlăul Piatra Neamț players
FC Politehnica Timișoara players
FC Steaua București players
FC Unirea Urziceni players
LPS HD Clinceni players
Armenian Premier League players
Ukrainian Premier League players
Super League Greece players
Liga I players
Expatriate footballers in Greece
Expatriate footballers in Ukraine
Expatriate footballers in Romania
Armenian expatriate sportspeople in Greece
Armenian expatriate sportspeople in Ukraine
Armenian expatriate sportspeople in Romania
Twin sportspeople
Naturalised citizens of Romania
Romanian people of Armenian descent